Himalaya Wellness Company (formerly Himalaya Drug Company) is an Indian multinational personal care and pharmaceutical company based in Bangalore. It was originally established by Mohammad Manal in Dehradun in 1930. It produces health care products under the name Himalaya Herbal Healthcare whose products include Ayurvedic ingredients. Its operations are spread across locations in India, United States, Middle East, Asia, Europe and Oceania, while its products are sold in 106 countries across the world. A hepatic drug, named Liv.52, is its flagship product, first introduced in 1955.

Himalaya Global Holdings (HGH), headquartered in Cayman Islands, is the parent company of Himalaya Wellness Company and the global holding company of the group. Apart from Bangalore, HGH has regional head offices in Dubai, Singapore and Houston.

History 

The Himalaya Drug Company was founded by Mohammad Manal, a nature lover, in Dehradun in the 1930s. Manal had the goal of commercialising Ayurvedic and  herbal products to suit contemporary needs, by focusing on  modern empirical research to demonstrate their efficacy.

The company moved to Bombay (Mumbai) in the 1950s. In 1955, it launched 'Liv.52', a hepato-protective, that became the flagship product of the company.

In 1975, Meraj Manal, Mohammad Manal's son, started a manufacturing unit in Bangalore, which helped the company grow its manufacturing capacity as well as to globalise.

Global markets 
In 1996, the company entered the US market following the introduction of the Dietary Supplement Health and Education Act of 1994. It then expanded into other countries.

As of 2015, the company sold its products in 91 countries with about 50% of its revenue from outside India. The company has a presence in 106 countries.

Products 
Himalaya Herbal Healthcare has a very wide range of products, which include "pharmaceuticals, personal care, baby care, well-being, nutrition and animal health products." The company has more than 290 researchers that utilise Ayurvedic herbs and minerals.

Himalaya Neem face wash brand is reportedly the second biggest in India. Mothercare products were launched in 2016.

References

External links
 Official website

Ayurvedic companies
Personal care brands
Pharmaceutical companies of India
Manufacturing companies based in Bangalore
Pharmaceutical companies established in 1930
Indian brands
Privately held companies of India
Indian companies established in 1930